N'Guiémé is a village in south-eastern Ivory Coast. It is in the sub-prefecture of Tiapoum, Tiapoum Department, Sud-Comoé Region, Comoé District. The village sits on the north shore of the Tano River, which in this area forms the border between Ivory Coast and Ghana.

N'Guiémé was a commune until March 2012, when it became one of 1126 communes nationwide that were abolished.

Notes

Former communes of Ivory Coast
Populated places in Comoé District
Populated places in Sud-Comoé